Ludovic Sylvestre (born 5 February 1984) is a French former professional footballer who played as a midfielder. He is the sporting director at Red Star.

Club career

Youth career
Born in the commune of Le Blanc-Mesnil in Seine-Saint-Denis, as a youth, Sylvestre spent time at Clairefontaine football academy until 2000, Guingamp and then Strasbourg.

Barcelona
In 2005, he was signed by La Liga side Barcelona. Playing for B teams he made just two league appearances for Barça. His debut came on 13 May 2006 as a 64th-minute substitute in a 3–2 away defeat to Sevilla. His full debut, seven days later, was also his last appearance for the club, a 3–1 away defeat to Athletic Bilbao.

Sparta Prague
In 2006 Sylvestre moved to Czech First League side Sparta Prague. His debut came on 29 July 2006 in a 0–0 home draw with Kladno. His European debut came on 14 September in a 2–0 win away to Scottish Premier League side Hearts in the First round of the 2006–07 UEFA Cup. He went on to make a total on 19 appearances in the 2006–07 season as Sparta won the league.

He started the 2007–08 season with Sparta Prague, making six appearances, before joining Viktoria Plzeň on loan in early 2008. He scored on his debut, a 2–0 home win over 1 FC Brno. He went on to make a total of 14 appearances, scoring one goal for Viktoria Plzeň that season.

Sylvestre made a total of 25 league appearances as well as eight appearances in the UEFA Cup for Sparta.

Mladá Boleslav
Later in 2008 Sylvestre joined Mladá Boleslav, signing a four-year contract with the club. He made his debut on 2 August 2008 in a 1–0 defeat away at former club Sparta Prague. His first goal came in the 2–0 home win over 1 FC Brno on 25 August. He made a total of 29 appearances in the 2008–09 season, scoring four goals as Mladá Boleslav finished 6th, just missing out on qualifying for the 2009–10 UEFA Europa League by two points.

The 2009–10 season saw Sylvestre score seven goals in 27 appearances.

Blackpool
On 8 August 2010, Mladá Boleslav stated on their official website that Sylvestre had travelled to England for a medical the following day with newly promoted Premier League side Blackpool and that he was due to sign a two-year contract with them.

Three days later it was confirmed that Sylvestre had signed a two-year contract with an option of a further year with Blackpool.

On 14 August he made his debut as a 59th-minute substitute as Blackpool marked their Premier League debut with a 4–0 win over Wigan Athletic at the DW Stadium.

His full debut came on 21 August in the 6–0 defeat to Arsenal at the Emirates stadium in the club's second game of their debut season in the Premier League. Three days later he scored his first goal for the Tangerines in the second round of the 2010–11 League Cup, a 4–3 defeat to MK Dons at Stadium MK.

Red Star
In September 2016, Sylvestre joined Ligue 2 club Red Star, marking his return to his homeland after playing abroad for twelve years.

He retired in summer 2018 having contributed 23 matches and 2 goals during the club's promotion from Championnat National.

Post-playing career
In August 2018, Sylvestre was appointed at Red Star F.C.

Personal life
Sylvestre was born in France and is of Martiniquais descent.

Career statistics

Honours
Sparta Prague
Czech First League: 2006–07

References

External links

 
 
 Mladá Boleslav profile
 

1984 births
Living people
People from Le Blanc-Mesnil
Footballers from Seine-Saint-Denis
French footballers
Association football midfielders
FC Barcelona Atlètic players
FC Barcelona players
AC Sparta Prague players
FC Viktoria Plzeň players
FK Mladá Boleslav players
Blackpool F.C. players
Çaykur Rizespor footballers
La Liga players
Czech First League players
Premier League players
English Football League players
Süper Lig players
Expatriate footballers in Turkey
French expatriate sportspeople in Turkey
French expatriate sportspeople in England
French expatriate sportspeople in the Czech Republic
French people of Martiniquais descent